Josh Banks (born June 13, 1994) is a professional gridiron football defensive lineman for the BC Lions of the Canadian Football League (CFL).

College career
After using a redshirt season in 2012, Banks played college football for the Wake Forest Demon Deacons from 2013 to 2016. He played in 43 games where he had 107 total tackles, five sacks, one interception, three pass knockdowns, two forced fumbles, and one fumble recovery. He scored a touchdown on September 15, 2014, after returning an interception 72 yards for a score.

Professional career

New York Giants
After going undrafted in the 2017 NFL Draft, Banks signed with the New York Giants in April 2017. He was placed on the reserve/injured list for 2017. He played in all four preseason games in 2018, but was waived at the end of training camp on September 1, 2018. He was re-signed two days later to a practice squad agreement, but was not retained following the conclusion of the season.

Orlando Apollos
Banks played for the Orlando Apollos in 2019 where he had 10.5 tackles and one sack.

Tampa Bay Vipers
Banks was drafted to play for the Tampa Bay Vipers in 2020 where he recorded 5.5 tackles.

BC Lions
On February 17, 2021, it was announced that Banks had signed with the BC Lions. After making the active roster following training camp, he played in all 14 regular season games in 2021 where he had 15 defensive tackles. In 2022, he played in 16 regular season games and again recorded 15 defensive tackles. He also played in both post-season games that year where he had four defensive tackles.

Personal life
Banks was born to parents Kenneth Banks and Necosha Lynn.

References

External links
 BC Lions bio

1994 births
Living people
American football defensive linemen
BC Lions players
Canadian football defensive linemen
People from Cary, North Carolina
Players of American football from North Carolina
Players of Canadian football from North Carolina
Wake Forest Demon Deacons football players